Jack Amiel is an American TV writer, producer and screenwriter. He is best known for co-creating Cinemax's period medical drama The Knick, and for writing the films Raising Helen (2004), The Shaggy Dog (2006) and Big Miracle (2012), all with writing partner Michael Begler.

Early life 
Amiel was born and raised in Manhattan, New York. He attended Fieldston School in New York City, and the University of Wisconsin–Madison, where he majored in History.

He met his future writing partner Michael Begler while they were in college together.

Amiel is of Jewish background.

Career 
After college, Amiel moved to Los Angeles and worked as a PA on a number of Fox sitcoms. He and Begler, who was working as a PA in New York, decided to write together shortly after, and Begler soon joined Amiel in Los Angeles. Their first writing job was on Fox's Herman's Head.

Amiel worked consistently from that point onwards, writing - with Begler - on a number of sitcoms, including Empty Nest, Minor Adjustments, The Jeff Foxworthy Show, The Tony Danza Show and Malcolm in the Middle.

In the mid-2000s, Amiel transitioned into writing feature films, penning the scripts for the romantic comedies The Prince and Me and Garry Marshall's Raising Helen, both released in 2004.

In 2006, Amiel wrote Disney's The Shaggy Dog, starring Tim Allen and Robert Downey Jr.

Amiel wrote 2012's Ken Kwapis-directed Big Miracle starring Drew Barrymore.

Cinemax picked up Amiel and Begler's The Knick to series, after they wrote the pilot script on spec. Steven Soderbergh came on board the series as director and executive producer. Amiel and Begler served as co-showrunners and executive producers, and wrote the majority of the series' episodes. The series premiered on August 8, 2014. It was renewed for a second season of 10 episodes, airing October 2015.

In April 2021, it was announced that Amiel and Bagler will serve as executive producers, writers and showrunners for second season of Perry Mason. Around the same time he signed an overall deal with HBO

Filmography 
Films

Production staff

Writer

References

External links 
 Jack Amiel on Twitter
 

Living people
Writers from Manhattan
Ethical Culture Fieldston School alumni
Year of birth missing (living people)
University of Wisconsin–Madison College of Letters and Science alumni
Screenwriters from New York (state)